Simão Víctor Santos (born 21 July 1982 in Luanda, Angola), is a professional Angolan basketball player. Santos, who is 198 cm (6'4") in height and weighs 91 kg (200 pounds), plays as a small forward. He competed for Angola at the 2011 FIBA Africa Championship.

At the end of the 2011 Afrobasket semi-final match in which Angola beat Cameroon 84-83 in overtime, a highly emotional Santos fainted and had to be taken away for medical attention.

References

External links
 2011 FIBA Africa Championship Stats
 AfricaBasket Profile

1982 births
Living people
Angolan men's basketball players
Small forwards
Power forwards (basketball)
Angolan expatriate basketball people in Portugal